East Clear Creek  is located in the Mogollon Rim area of the state of Arizona.

Kinder Crossing on the creek derived its name from Runyon C. Kinder, who herded sheep in the area during the 1880s. The crossing lends its name to Kinder Crossing Trail, a hiking route along the creek. Other crossings with trails include Horse Crossing, Jones Crossing and Mack Crossing.

Location

Mouth Confluence with Clear Creek (Little Colorado River tributary), Coconino County, Arizona: 
Source Coconino County, Arizona:

Fish species
 Rainbow Trout
 Brown Trout
 Brook Trout

General information
 Fishable miles: 34

References

External links
 Arizona Fishing Locations Map
 Where to Fish in Arizona Species Information
 Arizona Boating Locations Facilities Map
 Arizona Lake Levels
 Video of East Clear Creek

Rivers of the Mogollon Rim
Rivers of Arizona
Rivers of Navajo County, Arizona